Lauterach railway station is a railway station in the town of Lauterach in the district of Bregenz in the Austrian state of Vorarlberg. It sits at the junction of the standard gauge Vorarlberg and St. Margrethen–Lauterach lines of Austrian Federal Railways (ÖBB).

Services 
 the following services stop at Lauterach:

References

External links 
 
 

Railway stations in Vorarlberg
Vorarlberg S-Bahn stations